Bulla gouldiana, the California bubble, Gould’s bubble or cloudy bubble snail, is a species of sea snail, a marine gastropod mollusc in the family Bullidae, the bubble snails. It is found in shallow water on sheltered coasts of the eastern Pacific Ocean.

Description
Bulla gouldiana has a semi-transparent, paper-thin, globose shell that is brown or pale violet. The head, mantle and foot are yellowish-brown with mottled whitish dots. The aperture is wide anteriorly and narrow posteriorly. The egg mass is a yellow to orange tangled string of jelly, containing oval capsules. Each one contains up to 25 eggs, which develop into veliger larvae.

Distribution

References

Bullidae
Gastropods of Australia
Gastropods of New Zealand
Fauna of Western Australia
Gastropods described in 1895